Don Tonry (November 24, 1935 – May 17, 2013) was an American gymnast. He competed in eight events at the 1960 Summer Olympics.

References

External links
 

1935 births
2013 deaths
American male artistic gymnasts
Olympic gymnasts of the United States
Gymnasts at the 1960 Summer Olympics
Sportspeople from Brooklyn
Pan American Games medalists in gymnastics
Pan American Games gold medalists for the United States
Pan American Games silver medalists for the United States
Pan American Games bronze medalists for the United States
Gymnasts at the 1959 Pan American Games
Gymnasts at the 1963 Pan American Games
Medalists at the 1959 Pan American Games
Medalists at the 1963 Pan American Games
Illinois Fighting Illini men's gymnasts